The Alwero Dam, also known as the Abobo Dam, is a reservoir and irrigation system in the Abobo district of Gambela Region, Ethiopia. It was built in 1985 with Soviet Union aid, as part of a strategy by the Derg regime led by former Ethiopian President Mengistu Haile Mariam to increase resource spending on irrigation following the 1983–1985 famine in Ethiopia. It is located at a longitude of 34.4824508 and latitude of 7.8476356 on Alwero’s river, Abobo, Gambela Region. It was constructed for irrigation, with a water capacity of 74.6 million cubic metres, and a dam height of 22 metres. This offers a conducive environment for water resources development for the population settled in the lowlands area to irrigate the farm in the local region. But on the ground there is no irrigated land for agriculture and others, the land is empty aso our stomach empty the irrigation on Travel to south Sudan without give any benefit in Ethiopia except Some fisherman collect fish by individual

References 

Dams in Ethiopia